Steffi Götzelt (born 19 September 1960) is a retired East German rower. She won a world title in the coxed fours in 1985 and two bronze medals in the women's eight in 1981–1982. In October 1986, she was awarded a Patriotic Order of Merit in gold (first class) for her sporting success.

References

1960 births
Living people
German female rowers
World Rowing Championships medalists for East Germany
Recipients of the Patriotic Order of Merit in gold
Rowers from Dresden